C. clavata may refer to:
 Coilostylis clavata, an orchid species
 Cellypha clavata, a fungus species in the genus Cellypha
 Commelina clavata, a flowering plant species in the genus Commelina
 Clavus clavata, a sea snail species
 Curvularia clavata, a mold species in the genus Curvularia
 Cunninghamella clavata, a soil fungus species